Greg "The Hillman" Hill, born November 3rd, 1966 is a radio personality, within the Whole House Group who owns and operates several restaurants in the Boston area, including Howl at the Moon and Battle Road Brewing. Hill is also a well known jogger, participating In 5k charity runs, most notably earning more than $23,000 for a youth organization. In 2010, Hill founded the Greg Hill Foundation, which matches charitable donations from Hill's audience members.

References

Year of birth missing (living people)
Living people
American radio personalities
People from Boston